This is a list of aircraft of the  Royal Yugoslav Air Force during World War II. More specifically the German invasion of Yugoslavia.

Fighters 

 Hawker Fury
 Hawker Hurricane
Ikarus IK-2
 Rogožarski IK-3

Bombers and reconnaissance 

 Bristol Blenheim
 Potez 25

Trainers 

 Bréguet 19

References 

Aircraft
Royal Yugoslav Air Force
Yugoslavia